Põldeotsa is a village in Audru Parish, Pärnu County, in southwestern Estonia. It is located just southwest of Audru, the administrative centre of the municipality, on the coast of Pärnu Bay (part of the Gulf of Riga). The city of Pärnu is located 12 km east. Põldeotsa has a population of 178 (as of 1 January 2011).

References

Villages in Pärnu County